Purple Ribbon All-Stars was an American Southern hip hop supergroup under the Purple Ribbon Records (distributed  through Virgin Records) label. The group consisted of Big Boi, Killer Mike, Janelle Monáe, Sleepy Brown, Scar, Konkrete, BlackOwned C-Bone, Rock D, and Vonnegutt.

Discography

Albums 
 Got That Purp (2004)
 Got Purp? Vol. 2 (2005)

Singles

References

External links 
 Purple Ribbon Allstars website

Southern hip hop groups
Dungeon Family members
Musical groups from Atlanta
Hip hop supergroups
Musical groups established in 2004